Sydney Nuttall Hayes (18 July 1891 – 11 December 1944) was a British lacrosse player who competed in the 1908 Summer Olympics. He was part of the British team which won the silver medal.

References

External links
Olympic profile

1891 births
1944 deaths
Lacrosse players at the 1908 Summer Olympics
Olympic lacrosse players of Great Britain
Olympic silver medallists for Great Britain
20th-century British people